Pettus Glacier is a narrow deeply entrenched glacier 9 nautical miles (17 km) long, which flows north from Ebony Wall into Gavin Ice Piedmont between Poynter Hill and Tinsel Dome, Trinity Peninsula. Named by United Kingdom Antarctic Place-Names Committee (UK-APC) for Robert N. Pettus, aircraft pilot with Falkland Islands and Dependencies Aerial Survey Expedition (FIDASE), 1956–57.

See also
 List of glaciers in the Antarctic
 Glaciology

Map
 Trinity Peninsula. Scale 1:250000 topographic map No. 5697. Institut für Angewandte Geodäsie and British Antarctic Survey, 1996.

References

External links
 SCAR Composite Antarctic Gazetteer

Glaciers of Trinity Peninsula